The Marad massacre was the incident of religious violence leading to the killing of Hindus and Muslim at the Marad Beach of the Kozhikode district, Kerala, India.

In the 2002 Marad massacre at Marad, three Hindus and two Muslims were killed in a sudden breach of peace due to scuffles between two groups that began as a trivial altercation over drinking water at the public tap. Out of 393 people arrested, 213 were from Rashtriya Swayamsevak Sangh (RSS) and Bharatiya Janata Party (BJP).
Who were the rest?

In the 2003 Marad massacre eight Hindus were killed by Islamic extremist and one attacker, Mohammed Ashker, was hit by accident and was also killed. The judicial commission that probed the incident concluded that leaders of the  Indian Union Muslim League were directly involved in both the conspiracy and execution of the massacre. This political party was directly involved in both the conspiracy and execution of Kerala’s worst ever communal carnage, says the report of the judicial commission probing the three-year-old Marad massacre The commission affirmed "a clear communal conspiracy, with Muslim fundamentalist organisations involved". The commission couldn't find evidence to support the involvement of foreign organisations. The courts sentenced 62 Muslims to life imprisonment for committing the massacre in 2009 – most of whom belonged to the Indian Union Muslim League, People's Democratic Party, and National Development Front.

The attackers also threw bombs with the intention of inflicting more deaths, but the bombs did not explode.

January 2002 riots

On 3 and 4 January 2002 at Marad, three Hindus and two Muslims were killed in a sudden breach of peace due to scuffles between two groups that began as a trivial altercation over drinking water at the public tap. Police present at the time stood watching the incident, failing to capture the criminals. Out of 393 people arrested, 213 were from Rashtriya Swayamsevak Sangh (RSS) and Bharatiya Janata Party (BJP), 86 from Muslim League, 78 from Communist Party of India (Marxist) (CPI(M)) and Communist Party of India (CPI), and couple of them from Indian National League (INL), National Development Front (NDF) – now renamed "Popular Front of India" and rest of the parties. Government troops were later sent in to patrol the area.

Conviction
 27 December 2008: A Special Court convicted 63 accused, in a case relating to the May 2003 communal attack at Marad beach near Kozhikode in Kerala, while acquitting 76 others for want of evidence.
 15 January 2009: A sessions Court in Kozhikode pronounced life sentence on 62 of 63 convicts in 2001's Marad carnage case. One convict, who has already served five years in jail, was released.

May 2003 riots

On 2 May 2003, in the early evening, eight Hindus were hacked to death by a Muslim mob on the beach after reeling in their catch for the day.

Initial investigation report of the Crime Branch Inspector General of Police, Mahesh Kumar Singhla, had dropped enough hints that the NDF was behind the massacre of eight people at Marad on 2 May. Mahesh Kumar Singhla was not able to give enough evidences in front of Thomas P Joseph commission on his arguments.

Later, the government troops unearthed a huge cache of weapons including 17 bombs. The police commissioner, TK Vinod Kumar stated: "It was an operation carried out by a well-knit organization. It was a quick and sudden attack which was over in 10 minutes. The attack came from a particular community.".

One of the attackers, Mohammed Ashker, was also killed during the incident.

Aftermath and exodus of residents
The Marad killings created an insecure state for the inhabitants of Marad and it still continues. Police, Judiciary and Legislature are indefinitely dragging the case and they are unable to bring the criminals of first and second Marad killings in front of police in spite of continuous requests from different sects. The judiciary is dragging the case indefinitely by not convicting all the 134 arrested person, in spite of continuous requests.

Inquiry commission by Justice Thomas
The Marad Massacre had caused a public uproar against the apathetic approach of the investigating agency and mushrooming of a new breed of religious fundamentalism in the Kerala State. There were persistent demands for a judicial enquiry in the matter, in pursuance whereto, the then UDF government had appointed Thomas P. Joseph (District & Sessions Judge) as the Commission of Inquiry. He had submitted his report during February 2006 and the LDF ministry tabled the report during September 2006. The report had elucidated that a person known as "F.M." (Finance Minister) had funded for the massacre and also cast aspersions on various political parties and the government officials including the District Collector T. O. Sooraj Mohamed. A person named Hilal Mohammed (F.M. who was handling the smuggling of counterfeit goods at Calicut Airport) too has filed a petition demanding a probe into his alleged involvement in the matter. Both these petitions were filed through Advocate S. K. Premraj. During hearing, Advocate Premraj submitted that Hilal Mohammed's life is under imminent threat. The role of Indian Union Muslim Leader P. P. Modieen Koya and Mayin Haji (then chairman Kozhikode Development Authority)was also highlighted in the report. The commission's also recommends a further inquiry, involving the Central Bureau of Investigation (CBI) about the involvement of foreign agencies in the riots.

Key findings of Commission
Key findings of Justice Thomas Commission were
 "The patrolling and search for weapons said to be made by the local police were not effective or purposeful. To put shortly, the local police was lethargic in their attitude towards the situation at Marad Beach." (chapter 5, section 37)
"It was unfortunate that the household items were damaged at Marad Beach in the presence of police"(chapter 5, section 42)
 The then Chief Minister A. K. Antony and the then industries minister and Indian Union Muslim League (IUML) leader P. K. Kunhalikutty opposed any CBI probe into the massacre.
 The report mentions about the role of the Indian Union Muslim League (IUML) and the National Development Front (NDF). IUML leaders like C. Mayin Haji and P. P. Moideen Koya were named to be aware of the conspiracy beforehand.

Commission's main recommendation
The commission's main recommendation, was a further inquiry, involving the Intelligence Bureau (IB), the Central Bureau of Investigation (CBI) and the Directorate of Revenue Intelligence, into the "larger conspiracy" involving fundamentalist and other forces, and into the source of the explosives and funds that the CBCID "failed or refused" to investigate – an act that the commission described as "quite suspicious and disturbing".

Responses on commission's report
The Home minister of Kerala Government had written to the Union Government on 12 September 2006 recommending the CBI probe into the conspiracy behind the riots and issues such as the involvement of fundamentalist outfits, their foreign connections and source of funding and how they succeeded in secretly stockpiling weapons in the village for use in the riots.

A.K. Antony, who was the Chief Minister during both incidents, differed on Commission findings with a main point that the first round of violence should have included in the report.

Sentencing
Special court in Kozhikode on 15 January 2009 sentenced 62 of the 63 convicts to life in the May 2003 Marad carnage case. There were a total of 139 accused in the case. In December 2008, additional sessions Judge Babu Mathew P Joseph convicted 62 people for murder while a person was found guilty of abetment. The rest were acquitted of all charges.

Renewed demands for CBI probe
On 17 April 2012, Kerala High Court observed that there had been "deep conspiracy" behind the incident and that police had failed in investigating it effectively.

The Opposition leader VS Achuthanandan accused Chief Minister Oommen Chandy of trying to sabotage the Marad massacre case. BJP and Hindu Aikya Vedi and CPI(M)'s State secretariat member Elamaram Kareem also called for a probe by the Central agency.

Achuthanandan accused Chandy's Congress-led UDF, which is in coalition with Indian Union Muslim League, of having intervened in the Marad massacre case.

Kerala BJP president V Muraleedharan wanted initiation of a case against senior Muslim League leader MC Mayin Haji who had prior knowledge of massacre plan, according to the Judicial Commission.

New FIR
In 2016, CBI filed a fresh FIR with Muslim League leaders included in the list of accused.

In November 2021, two people were sentenced double life terms in jail by the special additional court.

See also

National Development Front
Popular Front of India

References

External links
 

Massacres in 2003
Conflicts in 2003
Massacres in India
Violence against Hindus in India
Crime in Kerala
Islamic terrorism in India
History of Kerala (1947–present)
Deaths by blade weapons
Attacks in India in 2003
Islamic terrorist incidents in 2003
May 2003 events in India
2003 murders in India
Riots in Kerala
Hate crimes in India